Line 2 of the Dalian Metro (M2), is a rapid transit line running in a "c" shape in central Dalian. Phase 1 of the line was opened on 22 May 2015.

In October 2017, most station names were re-translated from Pinyin into conventional English.

Opening timeline

Service routes
  —

Stations

References

02
Railway lines opened in 2015
Airport rail links in China